George W. Chorpenning Jr. (sometimes spelled 'Chorpening')(1 June 1820 - 3 April 1894) was a pioneer in the transportation of mail, freight, and passengers through the arid and undeveloped western regions of nineteenth-century United States. His efforts in the 1850s were vital to the integration of the then-new state of California with the established government and economy east of the Mississippi River.

Chorpenning was born in Somerset County, Pennsylvania, the son of a county judge. He spent his youth in Somerset, and as a young adult he established a business in nearby Stoystown, Pennsylvania. In 1850 he traveled to California in search of gold. Although he did not become wealthy by mining, he could see the critical need for fast and reliable mail service between California and the eastern states, most of which was then being transported by sea around South America.

He teamed with fellow Pennsylvania entrepreneur Absolam Woodward, and they received a contract in April 1851 from the U.S. Post Office to provide monthly transport of the mail between Sacramento, California and Salt Lake City, the most difficult leg of the first overland mail service. The mails were run once per month in each direction. It was a hard journey over the Sierra Nevada, and 16 days was considered good time.

Captain Woodward, of Indiana County, Pennsylvania, made his first run, from California to Salt Lake City, in the winter of 1851/1852. He (as well as four other men in the party) was killed in an Indian attack at Stone House, Nevada; after that Chorpenning had the contract alone, and initially rode the trips himself. Although he persisted in keeping to his agreement with the Post Office, he saw that the schedule was difficult to meet, and that their chosen route along the California Trail was difficult to follow, especially in winter.

Chorpenning renewed his mail contract in 1854, but switched the route to an all-season road from Salt Lake City southwest to San Diego, California, and from there by ship to San Francisco, California. In 1858 he received a third government contract, this time for twice-monthly service and including stagecoach (passenger) service. By then Chorpenning had learned from Howard Egan about a more direct route from Salt Lake City, around the south end of the Great Salt Lake Desert, and through the mountains of central Nevada to the new towns of Carson City, Nevada and Genoa, Nevada. In 1859 Chorpenning used the eastern half of this route, connecting with the original Humboldt River route at Gravelly Ford, near present-day Beowawe, Nevada. By 1860 the full Central Nevada Route had been surveyed by James H. Simpson and improved by the U.S. Army. Chorpenning built a series of provisioned way stations along the route to allow rapid exchange of mule teams.

Unfortunately Chorpenning also had his mail contract annulled in 1860, largely for political reasons. Companies headed by William Hepburn Russell took over the route, and used Chorpenning's way stations to establish the short-lived Pony Express mail service. The Pony Express became obsolete in late 1861 when the First Transcontinental Telegraph, also using Chorpenning's route and way stations, became operational. Transportation along Chorpenning's central route continued until the First transcontinental railroad was completed in 1869.

Chorpenning returned to the eastern states, where he was instrumental in organizing Civil War army units for the state of Maryland. He later petitioned the U.S. Government (unsuccessfully) to meet their contractual obligations for his mail transport service, a process which exposed the capricious nature by which they let (and annulled) contracts. George Chorpenning died in New York City in 1894. His hometown newspaper, the Somerset Herald, printed his obituary on 11 April 1894:

References

Nevada's Northeast Frontier, by Eda Patterson, Louise Ulph, and Victor Goodwin  (1969), 
Dictionary of American Biography, vol. II, p. 91
The Man from Somerset, by Frank Winslow  (1993), .  A semi-fictional account of the life of George Chorpenning.
The Overland Mail 1849-69, by Leroy R. Hafen (1929).  A detailed account of the various mail lines.

People of the American Old West
People from Somerset County, Pennsylvania
Central Overland Route
Pre-statehood history of Nevada
History of the Sierra Nevada (United States)
History of the Great Basin